Mother Goose Land is a 1933 Fleischer Studios animated short film starring Betty Boop.

Plot

Betty, while reading a book of Mother Goose stories, wishes she could visit such a wonderful place.  Betty's wish is granted when Mother Goose appears, and gives her a tour of Mother Goose Land.  Betty has a wonderful time until Little Miss Muffet's spider chases her, with lecherous ends in mind. All of the characters are terrified of the spider (during which, the Three Blind Mice are revealed to not be blind at all), but the blackbirds from "Sing a Song of Sixpence" come to Betty's rescue by catching the spider in a web and carrying it in the air, using it like a trampoline until the spider falls through the web. Betty wakes up in bed with all the fairy tale characters surrounding her while dancing, and then they jump back into the book, and when Mother Goose tries to imitate Betty's "boop oop a doop" catchphrase, her hat, wig and dentures fall out.

Production

This is the first of Fleischer Studios' retellings of classic fairy tales starring Betty Boop. Its production number is FL3317. It was originally released theatrically on June 23, 1933.

External links
Mother Goose Land at the Big Cartoon Database
Mother Goose Land on IMDb

References

1933 films
Betty Boop cartoons
1930s American animated films
American black-and-white films
1933 animated films
Paramount Pictures short films
Films based on nursery rhymes
Fleischer Studios short films
Short films directed by Dave Fleischer